Haemaphysalis cuspidata is a hard-bodied tick of the genus Haemaphysalis. It is found in India and Sri Lanka. It is a potential vector of Kyasanur Forest disease virus.

Parasitism
Adults parasitize various wild and domestic animals such as jackals, mouse deer, leopards, black naped hare, rats, Paradoxurus civets, mongooses, coucals, many birds, shrews and even humans. Larva and nymphs are parasites of porcupines, civets, jungle fowls, many robin species, shrews, hornbills, macaques, langurs, cattle and buffaloes.

References

External links
Life history of Haemaphysalis cuspidata Warburton, 1910 (Acarina: Ixodidae) 1977

Ticks
Ixodidae
Animals described in 1910